Sobre el Fuego is India's second solo album. The album received a Grammy Award nomination for Best Tropical Latin Performance and a Lo Nuestro Award nomination for Tropical/Salsa Album of the Year.

Track listing
 Me Cansé De Ser La Otra
 Costumbres
 Burlada Inocencia
 No Me Lo Confiesas
 Si Tú Eres Mi Hombre
 Mi Mayor Venganza
 Sobre El Fuego
 Te Daré Dulzura
 La Voz De La Experiencia (Duet with Celia Cruz)
 Si Estuvieras Aquí

Chart performance

See also
List of number-one Billboard Tropical Albums from the 1990s

References

1997 albums
La India albums
RMM Records albums